Tollville is an unincorporated community east of Little Rock in Prairie County, Arkansas, United States. It was reportedly founded by the Toll family, who were English emigrants. Founding families also included the Claytons and the Foots. Lord Thomas Marsh Horsfall, a local Englishman and entrepreneur, owned much of this prairie ground in the late 1880s, and many residents worshiped at an Episcopal Church (St. Peter's on the Prairie) that was erected in 1904.

References

Unincorporated communities in Prairie County, Arkansas
Unincorporated communities in Arkansas